Vellalapalayam is a panchayat village in Gobichettipalayam taluk in Erode District of Tamil Nadu state, India. It is about 5 km from Gobichettipalayam and 40 km from district headquarters Erode. Vellalapalayam is hometown for famous temples of Gobhichettipalayam including Pariyur Kondathu Kaliamman temple and Pavalamalai MuthuKumaraswamy Temple and has a population of about 4958.

References

Villages in Erode district